Krishna Das  may refer to:

 Krishna Das (singer) (born Jeffrey Kagel 1947), American vocalist known for his performances of Hindu devotional music
 Krishna Das (archer) (born 1959), Indian archer and Arjuna Award winner, 1981
 Krishna Das (cricketer) (born 1990), Indian cricketer
 Krishna Das (politician), Bharatiya Janata Party politician from Assam
 Krishna Das Kabiraj (1496–?), 16th century Vaishnava hagiographer, author of Chaitanya Charitamrita